The Electoral division of Monmouth was an electoral division in the Tasmanian Legislative Council of Australia. It existed from 1946, when it was created out of the amalgamation of Cambridge with parts of Macquarie, to 1999, when it was renamed Rumney.

Members

See also
Tasmanian Legislative Council electoral divisions

References
Past election results for Monmouth

Former electoral districts of Tasmania
1999 disestablishments in Australia